Rainier Mesa is one of four major nuclear test regions within the Nevada National Security Site (NNSS). It occupies approximately  along the northern edge of the NNSS and corresponds to Area 12.

The Rainier Mesa area consists of both Rainier Mesa proper and the contiguous Aqueduct Mesa.

At , the top of Rainier Mesa is the highest elevation within the NNSS.

Nuclear testing

Area 12 held 61 nuclear tests between 1957 and 1992, one of which involved two detonations. All tests were conducted below Rainier and Aqueduct mesas.

Area 12 was the primary location for tunnel tests and used almost exclusively for that purpose. The tunnel complexes mined into Rainier and Aqueduct Mesa include the B-, C-, D-, E-, F-, G-, I-, J-, K-, N-, P-, and T-tunnel complexes, and Q- and R- shafts.

There has been some concern that Rainier Mesa is exhibiting signs of tired mountain syndrome, due to the number of nuclear detonations that have occurred at the site.

Current activities

The Area 12 Camp was renovated and upgraded and provides a secure base camp for military units and other government agencies for conducting counter-terrorism and other exercises in the northern region of the NNSS. It provides an urban terrain setting utilizing existing commercial, residential, and industrial buildings. The camp includes 200 dormitory rooms, a cafeteria, weapons and munitions storage, and numerous operations and support buildings. The Office of Secure Transportation uses it as a training facility.

Notes

References 

Nevada Test Site